SS Armonia was a  cargo ship built in Britain in 1924 for the Moor Line as SS Tullochmoor. Scrapped in 1960, she had eight sets of owners, managers and names over her 26-year career.

She is known today by her sixth name, Armonia, which she bore in April 1958 when a CIA aircraft involved in a covert mission against the Sukarno government bombed and damaged her in the Molucca Islands in eastern Indonesia.

Service history
The ship was launched by Blyth Shipbuilding & Drydock Co Ltd as Tullochmoor at Blyth, Northumberland and completed in October 1924. She was owned by Moor Line and managed by Walter Runciman and Company. In 1936 she was sold to Franz L Nimitz of Stettin, Germany, who renamed her Brigitte. In May 1945 she was at Hamburg where she was seized as an Allied war prize. The UK Ministry of War Transport (MoWT) took her over, named her Empire Soar and placed her under the management of Sir Robert Ropner & Co. In 1946 she was sold to the Greek government, which renamed her Preveza. In 1948 she was sold to Synodinos Brothers of Greece who renamed her Danapris. In 1957 she was sold to A. Angelicoussis & Co of Greece who renamed her Armonia. In 1959 she was sold to Keanyew Shipping Co who renamed her Keanyew and registered her in Panama. In 1960 she was sold to Southern Commercial Co who renamed her Charlie. Later in 1960 she was scrapped in Hong Kong.

Bombing

At the end of April or beginning of May 1958 Armonia was in Amboina Harbour in Indonesia. On 28 April a Douglas B-26 Invader bomber aircraft, operated by the CIA and painted black and with no markings, bombed her. This now appears doubtful, as Aquilas wreck seems to have been identified in Ambon Bay. There is also some discrepancy over the date of the attack: one source states that the three ships were bombed on 28 April; another states that Armonia was attacked on 1 or 2 May.

References

Sources

External links

1924 ships
Steamships of the United Kingdom
Merchant ships of the United Kingdom
Ministry of War Transport ships
Steamships of Germany
World War II merchant ships of Germany
Steamships of Greece
Cargo ships of Greece
Steamships of Panama
Merchant ships of Panama
Maritime incidents in Indonesia
Maritime incidents in 1958
1958 in Indonesia
1958 in the United States
Central Intelligence Agency operations
Ships sunk by US aircraft
Ships built on the River Blyth